Hellbrunner Berg is a mountain in Salzburg, Salzburgerland, Austria.

Height

It's 515 meter high.

Location

It's located in the south of the Altstadt or Old City and close to the Schloss Hellbrunn, and a stone theater can be found there.

See also

 Salzburg
 Salzburgerland

Mountains of Salzburg